Carla Bley (born Lovella May Borg; May 11, 1936) is an American jazz composer, pianist, organist and bandleader. An important figure in the free jazz movement of the 1960s, she is perhaps best known for her jazz opera Escalator over the Hill (released as a triple LP set), as well as a book of compositions that have been performed by many other artists, including Gary Burton, Jimmy Giuffre, George Russell, Art Farmer, John Scofield and her ex-husband Paul Bley.

Early life

Bley was born in Oakland, California, United States, to Emil Borg (1899–1990), a piano teacher and church choirmaster, who encouraged her to sing and to learn to play the piano, and Arline Anderson (1907–1944), who died when Bley was eight years old. After giving up the church to immerse herself in roller skating at the age of fourteen, she moved to New York at seventeen and became a cigarette girl at Birdland, where she met jazz pianist Paul Bley. She toured with him under the name Karen Borg, before she changed her name in 1957 to Carla Borg and married Paul Bley the same year adopting the Bley name. He encouraged her to start composing. The couple divorced in 1967, but she kept his surname professionally.

Later life and career

A number of musicians began to record Bley's compositions: George Russell recorded "Bent Eagle" for his album  Stratusphunk in 1960; Jimmy Giuffre recorded "Ictus"  on his album Thesis; and Paul Bley's Barrage consisted entirely of her compositions. Throughout her career, Bley has thought of herself as a writer first, describing herself as 99 percent composer and one percent pianist.

In 1964, she was involved in organising the Jazz Composers Guild, which brought together the most innovative musicians in New York at the time. She then had a personal and professional relationship with Michael Mantler, with whom she had a daughter, Karen Mantler, now also a musician in her own right. Bley and Mantler were married from 1965-91. With Mantler, she co-led the Jazz Composers' Orchestra and started the JCOA record label which issued a number of historic recordings by Clifford Thornton, Don Cherry and Roswell Rudd, as well as her own magnum opus Escalator Over The Hill and Mantler's The Jazz Composer's Orchestra LPs. Bley and Mantler were pioneers in the development of independent artist-owned record labels and also started the now defunct New Music Distribution Service which specialized in small, independent labels that issued recordings of "creative improvised music".

She arranged and composed music for bassist Charlie Haden's Liberation Music Orchestra, and wrote A Genuine Tong Funeral for vibraphonist Gary Burton. Bley has collaborated with a number of other artists, including Jack Bruce, Robert Wyatt and Nick Mason, drummer for the rock group Pink Floyd. Mason's solo debut album Nick Mason's Fictitious Sports was entirely written by Bley and performed by her regular band with Mason as a guest, making it in effect a Carla Bley album in all but name.

She has continued to record frequently with her own big band, which has included Blood, Sweat & Tears' notable Lew Soloff, and a number of smaller ensembles, notably the Lost Chords. Her partner is the bassist Steve Swallow.

In 2005, she arranged the music for and performed on Charlie Haden's latest Liberation Music Orchestra tour and recording, Not in Our Name. She lives in Woodstock, New York.

Awards 
Bley was awarded a Guggenheim Fellowship in 1972 for music composition. 

In 2009, she was awarded the German Jazz Trophy "A Life for Jazz". 

Bley received the NEA Jazz Masters Award in 2015.

Discography

References

External links 
 
 
 EJN: Carla Bley
 Carla Bley and Steve Swallow video interview about Dreams So Real and working with ECM Records
 Carla Bley in conversation with Frank J. Oteri
 Watt/XtraWatt music label
 

Carla Bley at All About Jazz
Carla Bley interview at All About Jazz

1938 births
20th-century American composers
20th-century American keyboardists
20th-century American pianists
20th-century American women pianists
20th-century jazz composers
20th-century organists
20th-century women composers
21st-century American composers
21st-century American keyboardists
21st-century American pianists
21st-century American women pianists
21st-century jazz composers
21st-century organists
21st-century women composers
American jazz bandleaders
American jazz composers
American jazz organists
American jazz pianists
American opera composers
American women composers
American women jazz musicians
Big band bandleaders
ECM Records artists
Jazz musicians from California
Jazz musicians from New York (state)
Living people
Musicians from Oakland, California
People from Woodstock, New York
Post-bop composers
Post-bop pianists
Progressive big band musicians
The Golden Palominos members
Women jazz composers
Women jazz pianists
Women opera composers
Women organists